Yashashwi is a Sanskrit word that can be used as either a noun or a verb. It can also be spelt as Yashashwi, Yashaswi, Yashasvi or Yeshaswi. It means eternal success or fame for eternity.

Naming a boy Yashashwi generally means wishing them to be victorious or glorious or famous or successful. YASHASHWI name is gender neutral . Person with name 

Yashashwi are mainly Hindu by religion. Name Yashashwi belongs to rashi Vrushik (Scorpio) and Nakshatra (stars) Jyeshta.

Yashashwi has its origination from the Sanskrit word Yashaswin. The word was used frequently in blessings as "Yashashwi Bhava" during Vedic times by rishis and sages to bless kings.

This is one of the given names that prevails in Karnataka, Uttar Pradesh as well as other states occupied by Hindu population.

Yashashwi is a name which is used by mainly Indians and other Hindu people, such as Nepalese, to name their children. There is no gender biasedness on this name.

Nepalese given names